Susan I. M. Jameson (born 13 August 1941) is an English actress. She is best known for two roles: portraying Esther Lane in the BBC crime drama series New Tricks between 2003 and 2013, and voicing Mrs Wibbsey opposite Tom Baker in a series of Doctor Who audio dramas.

She is married to fellow actor James Bolam, with whom she has appeared in numerous episodes from various television series, including New Tricks, Heartbeat (playing three different characters), When The Boat Comes In, and Grandpa in my Pocket.

Filmography

 Coronation Street (1963–64, 1968) as Myra Booth
 The Likely Lads (1964) as Pat. Episode Double Date)
 Last of the Long-haired Boys (1968)
 I, Monster  (1970)

 Take Three Girls (1969-70)
 Say Goodnight to Your Grandma (1970 – episode of Armchair Theatre)
 UFO (1971 – episode "The Sound of Silence") 
 Special Branch (1974 – four episodes) as Detective Sergeant Mary Holmes
 Space: 1999 (1975 – episode "Dragon's Domain") as Professor Juliet Mackie
 When the Boat Comes In (1976–77, 1981 / series 1–4 / 30 episodes) as Jessie Ashton, née Seaton
 International Velvet (1978)
 To Serve Them All My Days (1980–1981) as Chris Forster
 Terry on the Fence (1985)
 Two Days, Nine Lives (1991)
 The Girl (TV movie, 1996) as Daisy Loam
 The Queen (2009) as Queen Elizabeth II
 New Tricks (2003–2013) as Esther Lane
 Midsomer Murders (2017) episode: “Last Man Out” as Germaine Troughton
 All Creatures Great and Small (2020) as Lillian Calvert

Radio

References

External links

1941 births
Living people
20th-century English actresses
21st-century English actresses
Actresses from Worcestershire
Audiobook narrators
English radio actresses
English television actresses
People from Bromsgrove District